Vanaküla may refer to:

Hannes Vanaküla, Estonian magician
Vanaküla, Harju County, village in Kuusalu Parish, Harju County, Estonia
Vanaküla, Lääne-Nigula Parish, village in Lääne-Nigula Parish, Lääne County, Estonia
Vanaküla / Gambyn, village in Lääne-Nigula Parish, Lääne County, Estonia
Vanaküla, Põlva County, village in Põlva Parish, Põlva County, Estonia